Kaitlyn Ashmore (born 8 November 1991) is an Australian rules footballer playing for the Hawthorn Football Club in the AFL Women's (AFLW). She has previously played for Brisbane and North Melbourne. She was drafted by Brisbane as a priority signing in the 2016 AFL Women's draft.

Early football career
Ashmore first played football in Ballarat. In 2012, she became a Vic Country representative in Australian rules football, and in the same year won the Pierre de Coubertin award from the Victorian Olympic Council as the most outstanding athlete. The next year, she was selected by the Melbourne Football Club to compete in the first AFL-sanctioned women's exhibition match against the Western Bulldogs. She was selected by Melbourne again in 2014.

After playing for Melbourne against the Western Bulldogs for two years, Ashmore was drafted by the Bulldogs with pick number 13 in the 2015 women’s AFL draft. With the Bulldogs in 2015, she played in the first ever women's AFL game to be live broadcast on television.

Concurrently with playing these early women's AFL exhibition games, Ashmore played for Melbourne University in the Victorian Women’s Football League premier division. In 2014, she also played for Federation University's gold medal winning team, and was selected in the All-Australian team  at the Australian University Games.

AFL Women's career

Brisbane
This required her to relocate 1,600 km from Melbourne to Brisbane. At the end of the 2017 season, Ashmore was listed in the 40-player All-Australian squad. On 24 May 2017, Ashmore signed with Brisbane for the 2018 season.

North Melbourne
After two seasons at Brisbane, Ashmore joined  who entered the AFLW competition in 2019. She returned for 2020 and 2021, and was the team's leading goalkicker in the shortened 2020 season with 9 goals.

In Round 6, 2021, she became the first AFLW player to win 25 games, ahead of any club reaching the milestone.

Hawthorn
In June 2022, Ashmore was traded to expansion club Hawthorn.

Personal life
Off-field, Ashmore completed a teaching degree at Federation University 
She is a qualified teacher and currently works as a Primary School teacher in Melbourne.

Statistics
Updated to the end of S7 (2022)

|-
| 2017 ||  || 10
| 8 || 2 || 4 || 57 || 18 || 75 || 22 || 12 || 0.3 || 0.5 || 7.1 || 2.3 || 9.4 || 2.8 || 1.5 || 8
|-
| 2018 ||  || 10
| 8 || 3 || 5 || 54 || 28 || 82 || 24 || 28 || 0.4 || 0.6 || 6.8 || 3.5 || 10.3 || 3.0 || 3.5 || 0
|-
| 2019 ||  || 10
| 7 || 4 || 3 || 63 || 8 || 71 || 29 || 38 || 0.6 || 0.4 || 9.0 || 1.1 || 10.1 || 4.1 || 5.4 || 0
|-
| 2020 ||  || 10
| 7 || 9 || 3 || 44 || 10 || 54 || 16 || 20 || 1.3 || 0.4 || 6.3 || 1.4 || 7.7 || 2.3 || 2.9 || 2
|-
| 2021 ||  || 10
| 10 || 1 || 8 || 105 || 32 || 137 || 37 || 32 || 0.1 || 0.8 || 10.5 || 3.2 || 13.7 || 3.7 || 3.2 || 0
|-
| 2022 ||  || 10
| 9 || 3 || 4 || 76 || 30 || 106 || 36 || 16 || 0.3 || 0.4 || 8.4 || 3.3 || 11.8 || 4.0 || 1.8 || 0
|-
| S7 (2022) ||  || 10
| 9 || 1 || 3 || 79 || 31 || 110 || 25 || 47 || 0.1 || 0.3 || 8.8 || 3.4 || 12.2 || 2.8 || 5.2 || 2
|- class="sortbottom"
! colspan=3| Career
! 58 || 23 || 30 || 478 || 157 || 635 || 189 || 193 || 0.4 || 0.5 || 8.2 || 2.7 || 10.9 || 3.3 || 3.3 || 12
|}

Honours and achievements 
Team
 AFL Women's minor premiership: 2017

Individual
 North Melbourne leading goalkicker: 2020
  record holder for most marks: 25 (Tied with Jess Duffin, and Akec Makur Chuot)
  record holder for most marks in a season: 25 – S7 (2022) (Tied with Jess Duffin, and Akec Makur Chuot)
  record holder for marks in a game: 6 – S7 (2022)
  record holder for behinds in a game: 2 – S7 (2022) (Tied with Jess Duffin, Jasmine Fleming, and Aileen Gilroy)

References

External links

1991 births
Living people
Brisbane Lions (AFLW) players
Australian rules footballers from Ballarat
Sportswomen from Victoria (Australia)
North Melbourne Football Club (AFLW) players
Melbourne University Football Club (VFLW) players
Indigenous Australian players of Australian rules football
Hawthorn Football Club (AFLW) players